A boma is a lowest-level administrative division, below payams, in South Sudan. Equivalent fifth-level divisions elsewhere are described as village, block or ward. As of 2009, South Sudan's 514 payams have an average of 4.2 bomas each.  Bomas vary in size and typically contain many individual villages.  The term boma originated from the town of Boma in Jonglei, the first place captured by the Sudan People's Liberation Army at the start of its 1983 insurgency.

References

External links 

Subdivisions of South Sudan